The Book of Northern Qi (Chinese: 北齊書, pinyin Běi Qí Shū), was the official history of the Chinese dynasty Northern Qi.  It was written by the Tang Dynasty historian Li Baiyao (李百藥) and was completed in 636.  It is listed among the official Twenty-Four Histories of China. The original book contained 50 chapters but it was found during the Song Dynasty that only 17 chapters were intact. The rest are lost.

Contents

Annals (紀)

Biographies (列傳)

External links 

 Book of Northern Qi 《北齊書》 Chinese text with matching English vocabulary

Twenty-Four Histories
7th-century history books
Northern Qi
History books about the Northern and Southern dynasties
Tang dynasty literature
7th-century Chinese books